Lori McNeil was the defending champion and won in the final, 6–2, 6–2, against Zina Garrison-Jackson.

Seeds
The top eight seeds receive a bye into the second round.

  Zina Garrison-Jackson (final)
  Lori McNeil (Champion)
  Iva Majoli (quarterfinals)
  Nathalie Tauziat (semifinals)
  Brenda Schultz (semifinals)
  Patty Fendick (third round)
  Meredith McGrath (second round)
  Pam Shriver (quarterfinals)
  Larisa Neiland (third round)
  Miriam Oremans (third round)
  Kristine Radford (third round)
  Rachel McQuillan (third round)
  Elna Reinach (third round)
  Joannette Kruger (quarterfinals)
  Laura Golarsa (quarterfinals)
  Clare Wood (third round)

Qualifying

Draw

Finals

Top half

Section 1

Section 2

Bottom half

Section 3

Section 4

References
 1994 DFS Classic Draws
 ITF Tournament Page
 ITF singles results page

DFS Classic - Singles
Singles